Tan Sri Amirsham bin Abdul Aziz (Jawi: أميرشام بن عبدالعزيز) is the former president and chief executive officer of Maybank. His parents A. Aziz Podo and Marsinah Djamil, migrated from Silungkang, West Sumatra. He was recently named as Minister in the Prime Minister's Department in charge of the Economic Planning Unit. Prime Minister Datuk Seri Abdullah Ahmad Badawi's move in appointing him as a minister was seen as an attempt in including specialists in fields of economics and law to help stimulate the Malaysian economy.

Amirsham's credentials have been exemplary since starting his career in Maybank in 1977. In 1994, he became the Maybank's managing director – taking over from Tan Sri Ahmad Don, who became Bank Negara governor. Amirsham subsequently became president and CEO in 2002.

On 18 March 2008, he was sworn in as senator at Dewan Negara, his first foray into politics.

Honour

Honour of Malaysia
  : Commander of the Order of Loyalty to the Crown of Malaysia (P.S.M.) (2008)

References

External links
 New ministers and deputy ministers, The Star, 19 March 2008.

 

Government ministers of Malaysia
Members of the Dewan Negara
Minangkabau people
Malaysian people of Minangkabau descent
Malaysian people of Malay descent
Malaysian people of Indonesian descent
Malaysian Muslims
University of Malaya alumni
Living people
Commanders of the Order of Loyalty to the Crown of Malaysia
Economy ministers of Malaysia
Year of birth missing (living people)